The  is a kei car manufactured by the Japanese automaker Daihatsu. It was launched in December 2005, which at launch was the cheapest car in Japan.

It was available as a 5-door hatchback in two distinct styles - Esse or Esse Custom. The Esse was available in Eco, D, L and X grade levels with front- or four-wheel drive layout. The Esse Custom was added in November 2006. All versions were powered by a  KF-VE three-cylinder petrol engine.

The production ended in September 2011 and replaced by the Mira e:S.

According to Daihatsu, the name "Esse" was derived from the Latin root for the English word "essence", although it has also been used as a backronym for "Eco, Smart, Simple & Easy" in marketing.

References

External links 

 

Esse
Cars introduced in 2005
2010s cars
Kei cars
Hatchbacks
Front-wheel-drive vehicles
All-wheel-drive vehicles